Yannick Tremblay (born August 25, 1977) is a Canadian professional ice hockey right winger. 

Tremblay played major junior hockey with Chicoutimi Saguenéens in 1992–93, three and a half seasons with the Sherbrooke Faucons, and a final half a season with Rimouski Océanic. After four seasons of college hockey with Université de Moncton, he joined Lacroix de Windsor of the QSPHL in 2002–03. The following season, while playing most of the time with QSPHL franchise Saint-François de Sherbrooke, Tremblay also played five games with Mississippi Sea Wolves in the ECHL, recording an assist.

References

1977 births
Canadian ice hockey right wingers
Chicoutimi Saguenéens (QMJHL) players
French Quebecers
Ice hockey people from Quebec
London Racers players
Mississippi Sea Wolves players
People from Alma, Quebec
Ligue Nord-Américaine de Hockey players
Rimouski Océanic players
Sherbrooke Faucons players
Living people
Canadian expatriate ice hockey players in England